Bildung ("education", "formation", etc.) refers to the German tradition of self-cultivation (as related to the German for: creation, image, shape), wherein philosophy and education are linked in a manner that refers to a process of both personal and cultural maturation. This maturation is a harmonization of the individual's mind and heart and in a unification of selfhood and identity within the broader society, as evidenced with the literary tradition of Bildungsroman.

In this sense, the process of harmonization of mind, heart, selfhood and identity is achieved through personal transformation, which presents a challenge to the individual's accepted beliefs. In Hegel's writings, the challenge of personal growth often involves an agonizing alienation from one's "natural consciousness" that leads to a reunification and development of the self. Similarly, although social unity requires well-formed institutions, it also requires a diversity of individuals with the freedom (in the positive sense of the term) to develop a wide-variety of talents and abilities and this requires personal agency. However, rather than an end state, both individual and social unification is a process that is driven by unrelenting negations.

In this sense, education involves the shaping of the human being with regard to their own humanity as well as their innate intellectual skills. So, the term refers to a process of becoming that can be related to a process of becoming within existentialism.

The term Bildung also corresponds to the Humboldtian model of higher education from the work of Prussian philosopher and educational administrator Wilhelm von Humboldt (1767–1835). Thus, in this context, the concept of education becomes a lifelong process of human development, rather than mere training in gaining certain external knowledge or skills. Such training in skills is known by the German words Erziehung, and Ausbildung. Bildung in contrast is seen as a process wherein an individual's spiritual and cultural sensibilities as well as life, personal and social skills are in process of continual expansion and growth. Bildung is seen as a way to become more free due to higher self-reflection. Von Humboldt wrote with respect to Bildung in 1793/1794: "Education [Bildung], truth and virtue" must be disseminated to such an extent that the "concept of mankind" takes on a great and dignified form in each individual (GS, I, p. 284). However, this shall be achieved personally by each individual, who must "absorb the great mass of material offered to him by the world around him and by his inner existence, using all the possibilities of his receptiveness; he must then reshape that material with all the energies of his own activity and appropriate it to himself so as to create an interaction between his own personality and nature in a most general, active and harmonious form".Most explicitly in Hegel's writings, the Bildung tradition rejects the pre-Kantian metaphysics of being for a post-Kantian metaphysics of experience that rejects universal narratives. Much of Hegel's writings were about the nature of education (both Bildung and Erziehung), reflecting his own role as a teacher and administrator in German secondary schools, and in his more general writings. More recently, Gadamer and McDowell have used the concept in their writings.

Bildung in Germany today 
Professor of philosophy Julian Nida-Rümelin has challenged the idea that Bildung is no more than 'normal' education.

See also 
 Bildungsbürgertum
 Cultural literacy
 Etiquette
 General knowledge
 High culture
 Manners
 Prudence
 Wisdom

References 

 Bruford, W.H. (1975). The German Tradition of Self-Cultivation: Bildung from Humboldt to Thomas Mann, London: Cambridge University Press.
 Wood, Allen W. (1998). "Hegel on Education," Amélie O. Rorty (ed.) Philosophy as Education. London: Routledge, 1998.
 Alves, Alexandre (2019). "The German Tradition of Self-Cultivation (Bildung) and its Historical Meaning", Educação & Realidade 44(2).https://www.scielo.br/j/edreal/a/HLLcPFh84zpNNdDrrvnBWvb/?lang=en 

Education in Germany
Philosophy of education
German words and phrases
Personal development
Concepts in aesthetics